Chertsey sometimes seen as Surrey North Western, equally the North Western Division of Surrey was created as one of six county constituencies of Surrey for the House of Commons of the UK Parliament.  The seat underwent two net reductions and variously included and excluded growing suburban settlements: Egham, Frimley, Weybridge, Walton-on-Thames and Woking.

History

Context and contents
It was formed by the Redistribution of Seats Act 1885 for the 1885 general election. The 1885 Act in drawing for Surrey six county divisions first cast a much broader metropolitan area of 16 new parliamentary borough status seats (stretching from the old Lambeth and old Southwark seats (subdivided) to newly included Battersea, Clapham, Camberwell, Peckham, Dulwich, Norwood, Norbury, Croydon, Streatham and Wandsworth).  This spelt the loss of all three large, overpopulated and dual-member divisions (namely West, Mid and East) but Chertsey was one of the six non-metropolitan seats created in their large rural-suburban fringe (from Richmond and Hindhead to Lingfield and Warlingham); to do so Kingston was created as a seat which took in Richmond to its north and the Guildford seat was radically enlarged into a county division.  Creation of the County of London and Croydon County Borough circa 1889 meant that the 16 metropolitan seats (also known as the parliamentary boroughs in north-east Surrey) fell into those units administratively.

The seat at first comprised: 
the Sessional Division of Chertsey;
in that of Guildford so much as lay in the Hundred of Woking but not Stoke-next-Guildford
the parish of Frimley 

The seat was abolished for the February 1974 general election.

Political history
The seat elected Conservatives for 75 of its 79 years; for the 1906 Parliament and in the standing-record 1906 landslide result of that year it elected Marnham, a Liberal.  Tories took most of the votes cast except in the 1960s elections (1964 and 1966) when the candidate, in line with national trends, slid to the narrowest majority seen, 13.6%.

Boundaries 
1885–1918: The Sessional Division of Chertsey, the Woking Hundred part of the Sessional Division of Guildford save for Stoke-next-Guildford, and the parish of Frimley.  The first listed was chiefly Godley Hundred which contained the modern Borough Runnymede.  The second mentioned area resembled the modern boroughs Woking combined with Surrey Heath.

1918–1950: The Urban Districts of Chertsey, East and West Molesey, Egham, Esher and the Dittons, Walton-upon-Thames, and Weybridge, and the Rural District of Chertsey.

1950–1974: The Urban Districts of Chertsey and Egham, and the Rural District of Bagshot.

The seat lost a broad southern area for an eastern gain in 1918.  The seat lost that eastern gain in 1950 but gained Bagshot and surrounding villages.

The first form stretched from Egham in the north via Thorpe, Chertsey, Virginia Water, Longcross, Lyne, Windlesham, Bagshot, Chobham, Addlestone, Weybridge and Byfleet to Woking and Ripley in the south.  To the south-west it stretched to Frimley Green and included the inchoate makings of Camberley a town established in the late 20th century. The second form of the seat shed the areas to the south-west, Woking to the south and new urban district containing small former parishes adjoining — instead Hersham and Walton-on-Thames joined the seat from the Epsom division to the east.  The final form of the seat became nearly as compact as the early 21st century seat of Runnymede and Weybridge substituting Weybridge with Bagshot, Windlesham, Chobham, West End and Lightwater.

To the north and other directions, forming a large bend, lay the River Thames, at all times in the seat's history.

Members of Parliament

Elections

Elections in the 1880s

Elections in the 1890s

Elections in the 1900s

Elections in the 1910s 

General Election 1914–15:

Another General Election was required to take place before the end of 1915. The political parties had been making preparations for an election to take place and by July 1914, the following candidates had been selected; 
Unionist: Donald Macmaster
Liberal:

Elections in the 1920s

Elections in the 1930s 

Also described as a Liberal-Progressive
General Election 1939–40:
Another General Election was required to take place before the end of 1940. The political parties had been making preparations for an election to take place and by the Autumn of 1939, the following candidates had been selected; 
Conservative: Arthur Marsden
Liberal:

Election in the 1940s

Elections in the 1950s

Elections in the 1960s

Election in the 1970s

References 

Parliamentary constituencies in South East England (historic)
Politics of Surrey
Constituencies of the Parliament of the United Kingdom established in 1885
Constituencies of the Parliament of the United Kingdom disestablished in 1974